The Animals is the self-titled debut album by the British R&B/blues rock band the Animals. It was released in the United Kingdom in October 1964 on EMI's Columbia Records. The album reached No. 6 in the UK Albums Chart and held that position for 20 weeks.

Track listing

Personnel
The Animals
 Eric Burdon – lead vocals
 Hilton Valentine – guitar, vocals
 Alan Price – keyboards, vocals
 Chas Chandler – bass guitar, vocals
 John Steel – drums, percussion
Technical
 Mickie Most – producer
 Val Valentin – engineer

Charts

References 

1964 albums
EMI Columbia Records albums
The Animals albums
Albums produced by Mickie Most